Jeroen Veldmate (born 8 November 1988) is a Dutch professional footballer who plays as a centre-back for Eredivisie club Emmen.

Career
He came through the youth ranks of FC Groningen, making his debut in the 2007–08 season in a 5–1 lost away match against NEC, coming in as a second-half substitute for Koen van de Laak. After playing only seven league matches in two seasons, he signed a loan deal with Helmond Sport, where his brother Mark had just signed. Veldmate made his debut for Helmond Sport in a league win (4–0) against Fortuna Sittard on 7 August 2009. He returned to Groningen after the loan deal, playing only seven matches that season.

On 31 May 2011, he signed with Sparta Rotterdam together with his brother, Mark, for two years.

After one season in Rotterdam, Veldmate signed with Heracles Almelo. Between 2015 and January 2017, Veldmate played in Denmark for Viborg FF, but his contract was terminated after a series of injuries. In the summer of 2017, Veldmate signed for one year with FC Emmen.

On 2 June 2018, Veldmate signed a two-year contract with Go Ahead Eagles.

On 16 June 2021, he returned to Emmen on a one-year deal.

References

External links
 

1988 births
Living people
Association football central defenders
Dutch footballers
Dutch expatriate footballers
Footballers from Groningen (city)
FC Groningen players
Helmond Sport players
Sparta Rotterdam players
Heracles Almelo players
Viborg FF players
FC Emmen players
Go Ahead Eagles players
Danish Superliga players
Eredivisie players
Eerste Divisie players
Expatriate men's footballers in Denmark
Dutch expatriate sportspeople in Denmark